Karin Řezáčová (born 25 October 2001) is a Czech handballer for DHC Plzeň and the Czech national team.

She participated at the 2021 World Women's Handball Championship in Spain, placing 19th.

References

External links

2001 births
Living people
Sportspeople from Olomouc
Czech female handball players
21st-century Czech women